Chennai–Vladivostok Maritime Corridor is a proposed sea route covering approximately 5,600 nautical miles, or about 10,300 km, aimed at increasing bilateral trade between India and Russia. In September 2019 in Vladivostok, Prime Minister Narendra Modi signed a Memorandum of Intent for the route.

Background 
The current route from Mumbai to St Petersburg is about 3000 nautical miles longer.

Other ports that have the potential of being linked include Visakhapatnam, Kolkata, Vostochny and Olga.

See also
 Consulate General of Russia, Chennai
 India–Russia relations
 Chennai Port
 Ennore Port
 Economy of Chennai

References 

India–Russia relations
Trade routes
Economy of Chennai